Gorenje Blato is a settlement in the Municipality of Škofljica in central Slovenia. It lies on the edge of the marshlands south of the capital Ljubljana, east of Pijava Gorica. The municipality is part of the traditional region of Lower Carniola and is now included in the Central Slovenia Statistical Region.

Name
Gorenje Blato was attested in historical sources as Mos in 1267 and Moss in 1424.

Cultural heritage
There is a small chapel-shrine in the settlement, dating to the 17th century. It contains a wooden altar with a statue of Mary.

References

External links

Gorenje Blato on Geopedia

Populated places in the Municipality of Škofljica